Võ Trần Trường An (born 26 April 1981) represented Vietnam at the 1996 Summer Olympics in swimming.

Career 

Võ finished 52nd out of 55 competitors in the women's 50m freestyle with a time
of 29.02 seconds. She retired from swimming four years later.

Personal life 

Võ owned a shop at Ben Thanh Market.

References

External links
 

1981 births
Living people
Olympic swimmers of Vietnam
Swimmers at the 1996 Summer Olympics
Vietnamese female freestyle swimmers
21st-century Vietnamese women